The Soumagne Tunnel is the longest rail tunnel in Belgium, with a length of . Built on the HSL 3 line of the Belgian TGV service for Brussels-Liège-Cologne, the tunnel was completed in 2004. The new line was opened on 12 June 2009. Construction and outfitting of the tunnel took place from 2001 to 2005, with the first trains passing through in 2009. The entrances are at Vaux-sous-Chèvremont  and  Soumagne . The tunnel passes under Chaudfontaine, Fléron, Romsée and Ayeneux.

Dozens of geological layers of differing hardness had to be tunnelled through, lime layers needing to be blasted through with dynamite. The tunnel reaches a depth of 127 m in some areas; it has an average ramp height of 1.7%, with a maximum of 2% at the entrance in Soumagne.

See also 
 List of tunnels in Belgium

References

Sources
 This article incorporates text translated from the corresponding French Wikipedia article as of November 3, 2010.

Railway tunnels in Belgium
Tunnels completed in 2004
Buildings and structures in Liège Province
Chaudfontaine
Soumagne